Madison Chan (born 26 October 1997) is an Australian female acrobatic gymnast. With partners Mei Hubnik and Amber Kaldor, Chan achieved 15th in the 2014 Acrobatic Gymnastics World Championships.

References

1997 births
Living people
Australian acrobatic gymnasts
Female acrobatic gymnasts